Powering Australian Renewables (PowAR) is an Australian infrastructure investment fund closely associated with but independent from AGL Energy.

Initial investment in PowAR was $200M from AGL, and up to $800M from each of QIC Global Infrastructure Fund and the Australian sovereign wealth fund, the Future Fund.

PowAR’s initial assets included the Nyngan Solar Plant and the Broken Hill Solar Plant, both developed by AGL Energy in 2015. It added Silverton Wind Farm and Coopers Gap Wind Farm soon after, both developed by AGL. In 2021, PowAR was a partner in a consortium formed to take over Tilt Renewables. PowAR would receive the Australian assets of Tilt Renewables, with Mercury NZ to receive the New Zealand assets.

As of 2022, PowAR has merged with Tilt Renewables following a complex acquisition and merger, making it the largest private developer and generator of renewable electricity in Australia.

References

Investment funds